Joscha Wosz (born 20 July 2002) is a German professional footballer who plays as a midfielder for  club SC Verl.

Club career
Wosz began his youth career at Hallescher FC, before moving to the academy of RB Leipzig in 2015. He made his professional debut for Leipzig in the Bundesliga on 3 October 2020, coming on as a substitute in the 83rd minute for Angeliño against Schalke 04, which finished as a 4–0 home win.

On 21 January 2022, Wosz returned to Hallescher FC on loan.

On 29 August 2022, Wosz signed with SC Verl on a free transfer.

International career
Wosz made two appearances for the Germany under-17 national team in 2018.

Personal life
Wosz is the nephew of former footballer Dariusz Wosz.

References

External links
 
 

2002 births
Living people
Sportspeople from Halle (Saale)
Footballers from Saxony-Anhalt
German footballers
German people of Polish descent
Germany youth international footballers
Association football midfielders
RB Leipzig players
Hallescher FC players
SC Verl players
Bundesliga players
3. Liga players